The men's 3 metre springboard, also reported as springboard diving, was one of four diving events on the diving at the 1936 Summer Olympics programme.

The competition was split into two sets of dives on separate days:

Compulsory dives (Monday, 10 August)
Divers performed five pre-chosen dives (one from each category) – a running straight somersault forward, standing header backward with pike, running straight isander-half gainer, standing backward spring and forward somersault with pike, and running pike dive with half-screw forward. 
Facultative dives (Tuesday, 11 August)
Divers performed five dives of their choice (one from each category and different from the compulsory).

Twenty-four divers from 15 nations competed.

Results

References

Sources
 
 

Men
1936
Men's events at the 1936 Summer Olympics